Marie Louise Victoire de Donnissan de La Rochejaquelein née marquise de Lescure (25 October 1772 - 15 February 1857), was a French memoirist. She is known for her memoirs, depicting her misfortunes and her part in the Vendée wars.

Life
She was born at Versailles as the daughter of the courtier Guy Joseph de Donnissan and the lady-in-waiting Marie-Françoise de Durfort-Civrac. She was a member of a court family, and the god-daughter of Madame Victoire. 

She and her mother left court after the outbreak of the French revolution in 1789, and retired to the family property in the country.

French revolution

In 1791, she married her cousin the marquis de Lescure, whith whom she had been engaged since childhood. The couple intended to emigrate in February 1792, but decided to stay in Paris on the request of the queen, and attended the royal court. 

She describe both the Demonstration of 20 June 1792 as well as the Storming of the Tuileries in her memoirs. She and her spouse left Paris before the September massacres. 

She accompanied her spouse during the Revolt in the Vendée. She became a widow in 1793. 

She left for Spain in 1797.

Later life
She was able to return to France in 1799. When a conciliatory policy was adopted, she managed to save much of the property of herself and her late spouse. 

In 1802, she secondly married , the cousin of her first spouse, and retired with him to her estates, both refusing all offers to serve in any capacity under Napoleon. In 1814, the couple took an active part in the Royalist movement in and about Bordeaux, when her spouse attempted to bring about another Vendan rising for Louis XVIII, for which he was killed. She died at Orléans in 1857.

Memoirs
Her memoirs, recording foremost her life during her misfortunes and her part in the Vendée wars, was first published at Bordeaux in 1815. They are considered to give a remarkable picture of the war and the fortunes of the Royalists.

References

1772 births
1857 deaths
18th-century French memoirists
French marchionesses
 Cent
People of the War in the Vendée